Dhamoni is a small village and Muslim religious site in the north of the Sagar district of central India.

Overview
Dhamoni, Tehsil Banda, was once a garh in the kingdom of Garh Mandala, with 750 mouzas. Although now a secluded place, an old fortress indicates Dhamoni holds archaeological significance. One curiosity in the hamlet is an active well, which, though situated in a dry area, has chilled water with curative properties.

References

Cities and towns in Sagar district
Sagar, Madhya Pradesh